Niederviehbach is a municipality in the district of Dingolfing-Landau in Bavaria in Germany. It lies on the Isar River.

References

Dingolfing-Landau